Pilodeudorix camerona, the tufted green-streaked playboy, is a butterfly in the family Lycaenidae. It is found in Guinea, Sierra Leone, Liberia, Ivory Coast, Ghana, Togo, Nigeria, Cameroon, Gabon, the Republic of the Congo, the Central African Republic, the Democratic Republic of the Congo, Uganda, Kenya, Tanzania, Malawi and Zambia. The habitat consists of savanna.

Adults feed on the flowers of Eupatorium species.

The larvae feed on Pterocarpus esculenta. They are attended to by ants of the genus Oecophylla.

Subspecies
Pilodeudorix camerona camerona (Guinea, Sierra Leone, Liberia, Ivory Coast, Ghana, Togo, Nigeria: south and the Cross River loop, Cameroon, Gabon, Congo, Central African Republic, western Democratic Republic of the Congo)
Pilodeudorix camerona katanga (Clench, 1965) (eastern and southern Democratic Republic of the Congo, Uganda, western Kenya, north-western Tanzania, Malawi, northern Zambia)

References

External links
Die Gross-Schmetterlinge der Erde 13: Die Afrikanischen Tagfalter. Plate XIII 65 k

Butterflies described in 1880
Deudorigini
Butterflies of Africa